In Greek mythology, the nymph daughters of the Titan Oceanus (Ocean), were known collectively as the Oceanids. Four ancient sources give lists of names of Oceanids. The oldest, and longest such list, given by the late 8th–early 7th century BC Greek poet Hesiod, names 41 Oceanids. Hesiod goes on to say that these "are the eldest ... but there are many besides" and that there were "three thousand" Oceanids, a number interpreted as meaning "innumerable".  While some of these names, such as Peitho, Metis and Tyche, certainly reflected existing traditions, many were probably mere poetic inventions. The probably nearly as old Homeric Hymn to Demeter lists 21 names, 16 of which match those given by Hesiod,  and were probably taken directly from there.

The roughly contemporary (? ) Greek mythographer Apollodorus and the Latin mythographer Hyginus also give lists of Oceanids. Apollodorus gives a list containing 7 names, as well as mentioning 5 other Oceanids elsewhere. Of these 12 names, 8 match Hesiod.  Hyginus, at the beginning of his Fabulae, lists 16 names, while elsewhere he gives the names of 10 others. Of these 26 names, only 9 are found in Hesiod, the Homeric Hymn, or Apollodorus. Many other names are given in other ancient sources.

The names of the Oceanids are of different types. The Oceanids were the nymphs of springs, and some of the names apparently reflect this aquatic connection, with some perhaps being the names of actual springs. Other names have no apparent connection with water. Some, consistent with the Oceanids' function, as specified by Hesiod, of having "youths in their keeping" (i.e. being kourotrophoi), represent things which parents might hope to be bestowed upon their children: Plouto ("Wealth"), Tyche ("Good Fortune"), Idyia ("Knowing"), and Metis ("Wisdom"). Others appear to be geographical eponyms, such as Europa, Asia, Ephyra (Corinth), and Rhodos (Rhodes).

Several of the names given for Oceanids, are also names given for Nereids, the fifty sea nymphs who were the daughters of the sea god Nereus and the Oceanid Doris.

List

See also
 List of Greek mythological figures

Notes

References

 Aeschylus (?), Prometheus Bound in Aeschylus, with an English translation by Herbert Weir Smyth, Ph. D. in two volumes. Vol 2. Cambridge, Massachusetts. Harvard University Press. 1926. Online version at the Perseus Digital Library.
 Apollodorus, Apollodorus, The Library, with an English Translation by Sir James George Frazer, F.B.A., F.R.S. in 2 Volumes. Cambridge, Massachusetts, Harvard University Press; London, William Heinemann Ltd. 1921. Online version at the Perseus Digital Library.
 Apollonius of Rhodes, Apollonius Rhodius: the Argonautica, translated by Robert Cooper Seaton, W. Heinemann, 1912. Internet Archive.
 Bouzek, Jan and Denver Graninger, "Chapter 2: Geography" in A Companion to Ancient Thrace, editors: Julia Valeva, Emil Nankov, Denver Graninger, John Wiley & Sons, 2015. .
 Braswell, Bruce Karl, Margarethe Billerbeck, The Grammarian Epaphroditus: Testimonia and Fragments, Peter Lang, 2007. .
 Brunck, Richard François Philippe, Apollonii Rhodii Argonautica Volume 2: Scholia vetera in Apollonium Rhodium, second edition by G. H. Schäfer, Fleischer, 1813. Internet Archive
 Caldwell, Richard, Hesiod's Theogony, Focus Publishing/R. Pullins Company (June 1, 1987). .
 Callimachus, Callimachus and Lycophron with an English translation by A. W. Mair ; Aratus, with an English translation by G. R. Mair, London: W. Heinemann, New York: G. P. Putnam 1921. Internet Archive
 Cicero, Marcus Tullius, De Natura Deorum in Cicero in Twenty-eight Volumes, XIX De Natura Deorum; Academica, with an English translation by H. Rackham, Cambridge, Massachusetts: Harvard University Press; London: William Heinemann, Ltd, 1967. Internet Archive.
 Diodorus Siculus, Diodorus Siculus: The Library of History. Translated by C. H. Oldfather. Twelve volumes. Loeb Classical Library. Cambridge, Massachusetts: Harvard University Press; London: William Heinemann, Ltd. 1989. Online version by Bill Thayer
 Evelyn-White, Hugh G., The Homeric Hymns and Homerica with an English Translation by Hugh G. Evelyn-White, Cambridge, Massachusetts., Harvard University Press; London, William Heinemann Ltd. 1914. Internet Archive.
 Fowler, R. L. (2000), Early Greek Mythography: Volume 1: Text and Introduction, Oxford University Press, 2000. .
 Fowler, R. L. (2013), Early Greek Mythography: Volume 2: Commentary, Oxford University Press, 2013. .
 Freeman, Kathleen, Ancilla to the Pre-Socratic Philosophers: A Complete Translation of the Fragments in Diels, Fragmente Der Vorsokratiker, Harvard University Press, 1983. .
 Hard, Robin, The Routledge Handbook of Greek Mythology: Based on H.J. Rose's "Handbook of Greek Mythology", Psychology Press, 2004, .
 Harder, Annette, Callimachus: Aetia: Introduction, Text, Translation and Commentary, Oxford University Press, 2012. . (two volume set).
 Hesiod, Theogony, in The Homeric Hymns and Homerica with an English Translation by Hugh G. Evelyn-White, Cambridge, Massachusetts., Harvard University Press; London, William Heinemann Ltd. 1914. Online version at the Perseus Digital Library.
 Homer, The Iliad with an English Translation by A.T. Murray, Ph.D. in two volumes. Cambridge, Massachusetts., Harvard University Press; London, William Heinemann, Ltd. 1924. Online version at the Perseus Digital Library.
 Homer, The Odyssey with an English Translation by A.T. Murray, PH.D. in two volumes. Cambridge, Massachusetts., Harvard University Press; London, William Heinemann, Ltd. 1919. Online version at the Perseus Digital Library.
 Homeric Hymn to Demeter, in The Homeric Hymns and Homerica with an English Translation by Hugh G. Evelyn-White, Cambridge, Massachusetts., Harvard University Press; London, William Heinemann Ltd. 1914. Online version at the Perseus Digital Library.
 Hyginus, Gaius Julius, Astronomica, in The Myths of Hyginus, edited and translated by Mary A. Grant, Lawrence: University of Kansas Press, 1960. Online version at the Topos Text Project.
 Hyginus, Gaius Julius, Fabulae in Apollodorus' Library and Hyginus' Fabulae: Two Handbooks of Greek Mythology, Translated, with Introductions by R. Scott Smith and Stephen M. Trzaskoma, Hackett Publishing Company, 2007. .
 Liddell, Henry George, Robert Scott. A Greek-English Lexicon. Revised and augmented throughout by Sir Henry Stuart Jones with the assistance of. Roderick McKenzie. Oxford. Clarendon Press. 1940. Online version at the Perseus Digital Library
 Meineke, August, Stephani Byzantii Ethnicorvm quae svpersvnt, Berolini: Impensis G. Reimeri, 1849. Internet Archive.
 Most, G.W., Hesiod: Theogony, Works and Days, Testimonia, Loeb Classical Library, No. 57, Cambridge, Massachusetts, 2006 . Online version at Harvard University Press.
 Nonnus, Dionysiaca; translated by Rouse, W H D, II Books XVI–XXXV. Loeb Classical Library No. 345, Cambridge, Massachusetts, Harvard University Press; London, William Heinemann Ltd. 1940. Internet Archive
 Nonnus, Dionysiaca; translated by Rouse, W H D, III Books XXXVI–XLVIII. Loeb Classical Library No. 346, Cambridge, Massachusetts, Harvard University Press; London, William Heinemann Ltd. 1940. Internet Archive
 Ovid, Ovid's Fasti: With an English translation by Sir James George Frazer, London: W. Heinemann LTD; Cambridge, Massachusetts: : Harvard University Press, 1959. Internet Archive.
 Ovid, Metamorphoses, Brookes More. Boston. Cornhill Publishing Co. 1922. Online version at the Perseus Digital Library.
 Pausanias, Pausanias Description of Greece with an English Translation by W.H.S. Jones, Litt.D., and H.A. Ormerod, M.A., in 4 Volumes. Cambridge, Massachusetts, Harvard University Press; London, William Heinemann Ltd. 1918. Online version at the Perseus Digital Library.
 Pindar, Nemean Odes. Isthmian Odes. Fragments, Edited and translated by William H. Race. Loeb Classical Library No. 485. Cambridge, Massachusetts: Harvard University Press, 1997. . Online version at Harvard University Press.
 Pindar, Odes, Diane Arnson Svarlien. 1990. Online version at the Perseus Digital Library.
 Scholia Graeca in Homeri Iliadem, edited by Wilhelm Dindorf and Ernst Maass, Volume II, Oxford 1875. Internet Archive
 Tzetzes, Chiliades, editor Gottlieb Kiessling, F.C.G. Vogel, 1826. (English translation, Books II–IV, by Gary Berkowitz. Internet Archive).
 Virgil, Bucolics, Aeneid, and Georgics Of Vergil. J. B. Greenough. Boston. Ginn & Co. 1900. Online version at the Perseus Digital Library
 West, M. L. (1966), Hesiod: Theogony, Oxford University Press. .
 West, M. L. (1983), The Orphic Poems, Clarendon Press. .
 West, M. L. (2003), Greek Epic Fragments: From the Seventh to the Fifth Centuries BC. Edited and translated by Martin L. West. Loeb Classical Library No. 497. Cambridge, Massachusetts: Harvard University Press, 2003. . Online version at Harvard University Press.

List
Oceanids